Chlorobis(cyclooctene)rhodium dimer is an organorhodium compound with the formula Rh2Cl2(C8H14)4, where C8H14 is cis-cyclooctene.  Sometimes abbreviated Rh2Cl2(coe)4, it is a red-brown, air-sensitive solid that is a precursor to many other organorhodium compounds and catalysts.

The complex is prepared by treating an alcohol solution of hydrated rhodium trichloride with cyclooctene at room temperature. The coe ligands are easily displaced by other more basic ligands, more so than the diene ligands in the related complex cyclooctadiene rhodium chloride dimer.

Catalyst for C-H activation
C-H activation is often catalyzed by chlorobis(cyclooctene)rhodium dimer as demonstrated in the synthesis of a strained bicyclic enamine.

The synthesis of a mescaline analogue involves enantioselective annulation of an aryl imine via a C-H activation.

The total synthesis of lithospermic acid employs "guided C-H functionalization" late stage to a highly functionalized system. The directing group, a chiral nonracemic imine, is capable of performing an intramolecular alkylation, which allows for the rhodium-catalyzed conversion of imine to the dihydrobenzofuran.

References

Organorhodium compounds
Homogeneous catalysis
Alkene complexes
Dimers (chemistry)
Chloro complexes
Rhodium(I) compounds